Douglas MacLean "Andy" Anderson (October 20, 1927 – January 8, 1998) was a Canadian professional ice hockey centre who played two playoff games for the Montreal Canadiens of the National Hockey League (NHL) during the 1952–53 season. The rest of his career, which lasted from 1947 to 1963, was mainly spent in the minor professional Western Hockey League. Anderson also played with the 1947–48 Edmonton Flyers team that won the 1948 Allan Cup the senior Canadian championship.

Playing career
Anderson played with the 1947–48 Edmonton Flyers that won the 1948 Allan Cup. In the tournament leading up to the final, played in Calgary, the Flyers played in Manitoba, Saskatchewan, Alberta and British Columbia. Out of 24 games played, the Flyer's record was 19 wins, four losses and one draw. This was a vital moment in Western Canada hockey history that helped create the foundation for Alberta's rich hockey tradition. The Flyer's thrilling victory over the Ottawa Senators energized the entire city and their victory parade attracted more than 60,000 people, half the population of Edmonton in 1948. The national title was only the third national hockey title ever won by an Alberta team.

Anderson played two playoff games for the Montreal Canadiens of the National Hockey League during the 1953 playoffs. He scored no points and had no penalty minutes during those two games. He qualified to be engraved on the Stanley Cup, but his name was left off, since he did not play regularly with Montreal. He spent most of his career playing for the Vancouver Canucks of the minor professional Western Hockey League. He retired from hockey after the 1962–63 season.

He was inducted with the rest of the 1947–48 Edmonton Flyers team to the Alberta Sports Hall of Fame and Museum in 2005.

Personal life
Anderson, who married Barbara Gayle Webster in 1953, devoted the rest of his life to raising his three children and spending time with his family. He died on January 8, 1998. Due to his commitment to athletes getting a good education, a memorial bursary was set up in his name and memory at the University of Victoria. His death date was confirmed with a newspaper obituary in Victoria.

Career statistics

Regular season and playoffs

References

External links

1927 births
1998 deaths
Buffalo Bisons (AHL) players
Canadian ice hockey centres
Montreal Canadiens players
Portland Buckaroos players
Ice hockey people from Edmonton
Vancouver Canucks (WHL) players
Victoria Cougars (1949–1961) players